Tamopsis brisbanensis is a species of spider in the family Hersiliidae, found in Australia (Queensland, New South Wales). It is sometimes called the Brisbane two-tailed spider. It is one of a large number of new Tamopsis species described by Barbara Baehr and Martin Baehr between 1987 and 1998.

References

Hersiliidae
Spiders of Australia
Spiders described in 1987